is a 1995 video game developed and published by New Corp for the PlayStation. It is a boxing simulation sports game. It was followed up by the sequel Boxer's Road 2: The Real.

Gameplay
Boxer's Road is a game which simulates an entire boxing career. It is a fully 3D polygonal game.

Release
It was released in Japan on September 8, 1995. The game sold 400,000 copies. On August 9, 1996, it was re-released under the "Playstation the Best" line. It was released on the PlayStation Network in Japan on July 26, 2007. It was re-released again for mobile phones in 2007 under the title "Boxer's Road the MOBILE" for 315 yen.

It was followed up by Boxer's Road 2, released for the PSP in 2005.

Reception
Next Generation reviewed the PlayStation version of the game, rating it three stars out of five, and stated that "The matches are something of a letdown, being realistic to a fault, slow, and with sluggish control.  The title shows an interesting effort, and with some tweaking it would make a fine US import.  Until then, unless you can read a good deal of Japanese, you're out of luck."

Famitsu gave it a score of 35 out of 40. Ultima Generacion gave the game a score of 60 out of 100. German magazine Mega Fun gave it a score of 86%.

Play gave it a score of 82%.

Reviews
Mega Fun (Oct, 1995)
SuperGamePower (Dec, 1995)
Computer and Video Games (CVG) (Nov, 1995)

Notes

References

External links
 Boxer's Road at GameFAQs
 Boxer's Road at Giant Bomb

1995 video games
Boxing video games
Japan-exclusive video games
Mobile games
PlayStation (console) games
PlayStation Network games
Video games developed in Japan